Medby is a village in Senja Municipality in Troms og Finnmark county, Norway. It is located along the Veidmannsfjorden on the southwestern part of the island of Senja. The village lies along a highway that connects the villages of Grunnfarnes and Sifjord. Medby Chapel is located in this village.

References

Villages in Troms
Senja